Anekabeeja is a genus of fungi in the family Microascaceae.

References

Microascales